Emmalocera euryzona is a species of snout moth in the genus Emmalocera. It is found in Australia.

References

Moths described in 1883
Emmalocera